Johann Halbig, (also Johann von Halbig) (13 July 1814 – 29 August 1882) was a German sculptor of the Classicism school.

Biography
He was born at Donnersdorf in Lower Franconia and was educated at the Polytechnical School and at the Academy of Fine Arts in Munich. After the early death of his teacher and employer Ernst Mayer he became his successor as  professor of sculpture at the Polytechnic School in  Munich, where most of his works can be found.   His work is characterized by its decorative quality. Johann Halbig died in Munich and was buried in the Alter Südfriedhof.

Works
His most notable production was the colossal group of a quadriga and lions on the triumphal arch (1847).  He also carved the lions of the Pinakothek and statues of Roma and Minerva in the palace gardens.  He created 18 colossal statues representing the leading German provinces for the Befreiungshalle at Kelheim; 60 busts for the Pinakothek (Munich); a statue of King Maximilian II for Lindau (1854); a monument of Count  Platen at Ansbach (1858); the monument of Marshal Cachahiba d'Argolo in Bahía, Brazil; a statue of King Ludwig I of Bavaria for Kelheim.  Among his later works are a statue of Fraunhofer in Munich (1866); an equestrian statue of King William I of Württemberg for Cannstatt (1876); the "Emancipation" group of sculpture in New York (1867–1868); and the "Passion" group at Oberammergau (1875).

Gallery

Notes

References

Further reading 
 
 Joseph Alois Kuhn (Anonym): Professor Johann Halbig und seine Werke, ein Beitrag zur modernen Kunstgeschichte. Knorr & Hirth, München, 1879. Digitalisat MDZ
 Longin Mößlein: Vom armen Bauernbuben zum geadelten Bildhauer in Schönere Heimat , Heft 2/2007 des Bayer. Landesvereins für Heimatpflege e.V.

External links

 
 

German sculptors
German male sculptors
1814 births
1882 deaths
Classicism
Academy of Fine Arts, Munich alumni
Academic staff of the Technical University of Munich
Burials at the Alter Südfriedhof
19th-century sculptors
People from Schweinfurt (district)